The Little Mule Mountains are a mountain range in Imperial County, California.
Colorado Desert
Lower Colorado River Valley

References 

Mountain ranges of the Colorado Desert
Mountain ranges of the Lower Colorado River Valley
Mountain ranges of Imperial County, California